Iran Hyper Star is an Iranian subsidiary of French multinational retailer Carrefour  in Iran

History 
Iran HyperStar Was Founded By Majid Al Futtaim And Carrefour.

Branches 
Iran Hyperstar Currently has Fifteen branches in Tehran, Shiraz, Isfahan, Yazd, Karaj, Mashhad, Sirjan and Ghazvin.

References

External links
 

Hypermarkets
Supermarkets of Iran
Iranian brands